Up and Coming is an American television drama series which aired on Public Broadcasting Service (PBS) during the 1980-1981 season.

Synopsis
The series depicts the Wilsons, a successful African American family from Oakland, California who moves into an integrated, middle-class neighborhood in nearby San Francisco. Although it was short-lived, it was one of the first weekly American TV drama series centered on an African American family (preceded only by Harris and Company, a 1979 NBC drama starring Bernie Casey).

Among the cast members were former Stanford University basketball star L. Wolfe Perry, Jr. and a teenage Cindy Herron (who years later would become a founding member of the R&B female quartet En Vogue).

The theme song is a cover version of the Bill Withers tune "The Best You Can".  The original version can be found on Withers' 1975 album Making Music.

Cast
 Robert DoQui as Frank Wilson
 Cindy Herron as Valerie Wilson
 L. Wolfe Perry, Jr. as Kevin Wilson
 Yule Caise as Marcus Wilson
 Gammy Singer as Joyce Wilson

References

External links 
 

1980 American television series debuts
1981 American television series endings
1980s American drama television series
PBS original programming
Television shows set in San Francisco
English-language television shows